The Panzara-Kan or Panjhra is a river in the Khandesh region of Maharashtra state of India. It is a tributary of the Tapi River. The Panjhra River originates just few kilometers from the small town of Pimpalner Tal - Sakri in Dhule District.

Akkalpada Dam is built on Panzara River in Sakri Taluka

At its headwaters is a small reservoir which was created when the Latipada Dam was constructed.

Notes

Rivers of Maharashtra
Tributaries of the Tapti River
Rivers of India